Blood Drive is the fifth album by stoner metal band ASG. It was produced by Matt Hyde (Slayer, Fu Manchu, Monster Magnet).The album was released on May 28, 2013.

Track listing 
"Avalanche" (4:17)
"Blood Drive" (3:16)
"Day's Work" (4:20)
"Scrappy's Trip" (3:37) 	
"Castlestorm" (3:55)
"Blues For Bama" (4:22) 	
"Earthwalk" (4:11)
"Children's Music" (4:41)
"Hawkeye" (2:42)
"Stargazin" (3:42)
The Ladder" (4:03)
"Good Enough To Eat (3:16)
"Mourning of the Earth"

References

2013 albums
ASG (band) albums
Relapse Records albums
Albums produced by Matt Hyde